Jean-Louis Marie Borloo (born 7 April 1951) is a French politician who served as president of the Union of Democrats and Independents (UDI) from 2012 to 2014. He also was Minister of the Economy, Finance and Employment in 2007 and Minister of Ecology, Energy, Sustainable Development and the Sea from 2007 until 2010 under President Nicolas Sarkozy.

Early life
Jean-Louis Marie Borloo was born in Paris, his parents were Lucien Borloo born in Guéméné-sur-Scorff and Mauricette Acquaviva from Marseille of Corsican origin. Borloo gained his Baccalauréat in 1969, in the Philosophy stream. In 1972 he took a first degree in Law and Philosophy at the Pantheon-Sorbonne University, in 1974 a further degree in History and Economics at Paris X Nanterre, and in 1976 an MBA at HEC Paris.

Political career 
Of Picard origin, Borloo began his career as a lawyer in the 1980s. He became president of the Valenciennes Football Club in 1986. In 1989, he was elected mayor of Valenciennes as an Independent, winning over 76 per cent of the vote.

In the June 1989 European elections, Borloo was elected to the European Parliament as the second candidate on Simone Veil's list. He held this seat until his election as regional councillor for the Nord-Pas-de-Calais in 1992.

Borloo was elected to the French National Assembly as a Miscellaneous Right candidate representing the Nord's 21st constituency in 1993. Joining the caucus of the UDF, he was re-elected in 1997, two years after his re-election as Mayor of Valenciennes.

He was a founding member of Ecology Generation in 1990, but he later joined the Union for French Democracy led by François Bayrou. However, in 2002 he joined the Radical Party, associated with the new Union for a Popular Movement. He was co-president of the Radical Party alongside André Rossinot between 2005 and 2007, when he became sole President of the party.

It was on the Radical-UMP ticket that Borloo was re-elected as a deputy in 2002 and 2007. He was Minister for the City and Urban Renewal in the Jean-Pierre Raffarin governments between 2002 and 2004, Minister of Labor, Employment and Social Cohesion under Raffarin between 2004 and 2005, and finally Minister for Employment, Social Cohesion and Housing in the Dominique de Villepin government between 2005 and 2007. In that role, he introduced a five-year plan of social cohesion, which was centered around three axes: equal opportunity, housing and employment.

On 21 July 2005 Borloo married news anchorwoman Béatrice Schönberg at Rueil-Malmaison, Hauts-de-Seine.

From 18 May to 19 June 2007, he was Minister of the Economy and Finance in the François Fillon cabinet. Between 19 June 2007 and November 2010, he was the French minister of State for Energy, Ecology and Sustainable Development. In this capacity, he was a major player in the 2007–2008 Grenelle de l'environnement. He quit the government allegedly after being passed over for premiership in a cabinet reshuffle.

In April 2011, Borloo left the UMP in protest at Sarkozy's rightward swing. He announced plans to set up a "republican, ecologist, and social alliance", with a view to becoming a candidate in the 2012 presidential election. However, he decided not to run as President of France.

In September 2012, he created the Union of Democrats and Independents (UDI), trying to unify all the Centrist parties, while the UDI still allies with the UMP.

Despite being a leader in the UDI, Borloo was not involved in the 2014 local elections, mentioning health reasons, such as frontal acute pneumonia and sepsis. On 6 April 2014, Borloo announced in a letter to the executives of the UDI that he would resign immediately from "every political term and position" due to his health concerns.

Governmental functions

Minister of State, Minister for Ecology, Energy and Sustainable Development: 2007–2010.

Minister of Economy, Finance and Industry: May–June 2007.

Minister for Employment, Social Cohesion and Housing: 2005–2007.

Minister of Labour, Employment and Social Cohesion: 2004–2005.

Minister of the City and Urban Renewal: 2002–2004.

Electoral mandates

European Parliament

Member of European Parliament : 1989–1992.

National Assembly of France

President of the Union of Democrats and Independents Group in the National Assembly : 2012–2014.

Member of the National Assembly of France for Nord (French department) (21st constituency) : 1993–2002 (Became minister in 2002) / Reelected in 2007 but he remains minister in 2007 / And 2010–2014. Elected in 1993, reelected in 1997, 2002, 2007, and 2012.

Regional Council

Regional councillor of Nord-Pas-de-Calais : 1992–1993 (Resignation) / March–November 1998 (Resignation).

Municipal Council

Mayor of Valenciennes : 1989–2002 (Resignation).

Deputy-mayor of Valenciennes : 2002–2008.

Municipal councillor of Valenciennes : 1989–2014.

Agglomeration community Council

President of the Agglomeration community of Valenciennes : 2001–2008.

Member of the Agglomeration community of Valenciennes : 2001–2014.

Political functions

President of Union of Democrats and Independents : 2012–2014.

President of the Radical Party (France) : 2007–2012.

Vice-president of the Union for a Popular Movement : 2009–2012.

References

|-

1951 births
Living people
Politicians from Paris
French people of Belgian descent
French people of Corsican descent
Ecology Generation politicians
Union for French Democracy politicians
Radical Party (France) politicians
Union of Democrats and Independents politicians
French Ministers of Finance
French Ministers of the Environment
Government ministers of France
Deputies of the 10th National Assembly of the French Fifth Republic
Deputies of the 11th National Assembly of the French Fifth Republic
Deputies of the 12th National Assembly of the French Fifth Republic
Deputies of the 13th National Assembly of the French Fifth Republic
Deputies of the 14th National Assembly of the French Fifth Republic
Mayors of places in Hauts-de-France
People from Valenciennes
Lycée Janson-de-Sailly alumni
HEC Paris alumni